In cricket, a ten-wicket haul occurs when a bowler takes ten wickets in either a single innings or across both innings of a two-innings match. The phrase ten wickets in a match is also used.

Taking ten wickets in a match at Lord's earns the bowler a place on the Lord's honours boards.

Ten wickets in a single innings

Taking all ten wickets in a single innings is rare. It has happened only three times in Test cricket.

Ten wickets across both innings of a match
Taking ten wickets across both innings of a match is more common, but is still a notable achievement. The bowler to achieve this feat the most in Test cricket was Muttiah Muralitharan, who did so 22 times.

See also
Five-wicket haul

References

Cricket terminology
Cricket records and statistics